A by-election was held in the federal riding of Battlefords—Lloydminster in Saskatchewan on December 11, 2017 following the resignation of Conservative MP Gerry Ritz

The seat was held for the Conservatives, with Rosemarie Falk winning the seat on an increased majority.

The by election was held on the same day as 3 others across Canada; Bonavista—Burin—Trinity in Newfoundland and Labrador, Scarborough—Agincourt in Ontario and South Surrey—White Rock in British Columbia.

Background

Constituency 

Battlefords—Lloydminster is a large rural constituency in Central-Western Saskatchewan. It includes the communities of North Battleford, Battleford and Unity; as well as the Saskatchewan portion of Lloydminster.

Representation 
Battlefords—Lloydminster is considered a safe seat for the Tories. Ritz had been Battlefords—Lloydminster's only Member of Parliament, holding the riding since its creation for the 1997 election, first as a Reform Party of Canada MP, then on behalf of the Canadian Alliance and since 2003 as a Conservative. He served as Agriculture Minister in Stephen Harper's cabinet from 2007 to 2015.

Campaign 
On August 30, 2017, it was reported that Battlefords—Lloydminster MP Gerry Ritz had asked not to be included in the reshuffled Conservative shadow cabinet. Ritz confirmed the next day that he would resign from parliament. The seat was vacated on October 2, 2017.

5 candidates won the election.

Former parliamentary staffer Rosemarie Falk defeated Langham Mayor John Hildebrand, small business owner Aron Klassen, Kindersley CAO Bernie Morton, and farmer Richard Nelson to win the Conservative nomination. Meadow Lake MLA and former Desnethé—Missinippi—Churchill River MP Jeremy Harrison was rumoured to be a candidate for the Conservative nomination, but did not make his intentions known before the cut-off date to join the race.

Rodeo cowboy and rancher Ken Finlayson's bid for the Conservative nomination was rejected by the party over concern that he was not a "team player". Finlayson ran as an independent.

Professional MMA fighter and athlete Matt Fedler was named the NDP candidate.

Contractor and former RM of Mervin councillor Larry Ingram was acclaimed as the Liberal Party candidate. Ingram previously ran for the party in Battlefords—Lloydminster in 2015.

The Speaker's warrant regarding the vacancy was received on October 3, 2017; under the Parliament of Canada Act the writ for a by-election had to be dropped no later than April 1, 2018, 180 days after the Chief Electoral Officer was officially notified of the vacancy via a warrant issued by the Speaker.

Results

2015 result

References 

2017 elections in Canada
2017 in Saskatchewan
Federal by-elections in Saskatchewan
Lloydminster
North Battleford